"God Bless America Again" is a country music song written by Bobby Bare and Boyce Hawkins. A patriotic hymn pleading for God's forgiveness of the United States and his guidance over the country, the song was first recorded and made famous by Bare. Released as a single in 1969, Bare's version reached No. 16 on the Billboard Hot Country Singles chart.

Chart performance

Cover versions
Many artists recorded "God Bless America Again" through the years, including Jan Howard, Jim & Jesse, Billy Preston, Tex Ritter, Floyd Van Laningham, Dee Vickery, Ray Charles and Bob Whitlock.

Also recording a cover version were Conway Twitty and Loretta Lynn, whose duet recording was the B-side to their No. 3 country hit "The Letter". The Twitty-Lynn version, released in 1976, featured Twitty speaking the verses while Lynn sang the refrain.  The Twitty-Lynn version was played during the closing credits in the 2012 HBO made-for-TV movie Game Change about Sarah Palin's role in the 2008 Presidential Election, which she and John McCain lost. Tex Ritter's version was featured in the opening sequences of the film Canadian Bacon.

The Charlie Daniels Band's 1980 Southern rock song "In America" quotes "God Bless America Again" and likewise deals with a struggling United States getting back in God's favor.

References

 Whitburn, Joel, "The Billboard Book Of Top 40 Country Hits: 1944-2006," Record Research, 2006.

1969 songs
1969 singles
1976 singles
Bobby Bare songs
Conway Twitty songs
Loretta Lynn songs
RCA Records singles
MCA Records singles
Song recordings produced by Owen Bradley
Gospel songs
American patriotic songs